Bolmån is a river in Sweden. The river drains the southwest portion of the South Småland peneplain.

References

Rivers of Kronoberg County
Rivers of Jönköping County